British Hero was launched in 1801 in North Shields. A French privateer captured her in January or February 1806.

British Hero first appeared in Lloyd's Register (LR) in 1804. She had already appeared in the ship arrival and departure data in Lloyd's List since 1802, trading with the Baltic.

The Journal de Commerce reported that the French privateer  had arrived at Saint-Malo on 13 February 1806 with two English prizes, one of 300 tons and one of 400. They were carrying sugar, coffee, rum, logwood, etc. Général Pérignon brought them into Saint-Malo.

Citations

1801 ships
Ships built on the River Tyne
Age of Sail merchant ships of England
Captured ships